This is a list of properties and districts in Dawson County, Georgia that are listed on the National Register of Historic Places (NRHP).

Current listings

|}

References

Dawson
Buildings and structures in Dawson County, Georgia